Town Moor may refer to the following places in England:

 Town Moor, Doncaster, South Yorkshire, which comprises Doncaster Racecourse and Doncaster Town Moor Golf Club
 Town Moor, Newcastle upon Tyne, Tyne and Wear
 Town Moor, Sunderland, Tyne and Wear